Alla luce del sole (By the Light of Day, also known as Come Into the Light and In the Light of the Sun) is a 2005 Italian biographical drama film directed by Roberto Faenza.

It is loosely based on real life events of Roman Catholic priest Pino Puglisi, who was killed by the Mafia in 1993.

Cast 

 Luca Zingaretti as don Pino Puglisi
 Alessia Goria as  sister Carolina
 Corrado Fortuna as  Gregorio
 Giovanna Bozzolo as  Anita
  as  Filippo Graviano
 Piero Nicosia as  Giuseppe Graviano
  as Gaspare
 Lorenzo Randazzo as Domenico
 Mario Giunta as Saro
 Gabriele Castagna as Rosario
 Salvo Scelta as Carmelo
  as Leoluca Bagarella
  as the politician I run
 Benedetto Raneli as Mayor

References

External links

2005 films
2005 biographical drama films
Films directed by Roberto Faenza
Italian biographical drama films
Films set in Palermo
2000s Italian-language films
Cultural depictions of Italian men
Films about the Sicilian Mafia
2000s Italian films